Acorn Hill is a mountain located in the Catskill Mountains of New York northeast of Wittenberg. Snake Rocks is located southeast, and Johns Mountain is located north-northeast of Acorn Hill.

References

Mountains of Ulster County, New York
Mountains of New York (state)